Aarne Üksküla (21 September 1937 Tallinn – 29 October 2017) was an Estonian actor and theatre instructor.

In 1961 he graduated from Tallinn State Conservatory's Performing Arts Department.

Career:
 Rakvere Theatre (1961-1968)
 Endla Theatre (1968-1978)
 Estonian Drama Theatre (1985-1988, 1993-2002) 
 Tallinn's Old Town Studio (1988-1993).

From 1978 to 2000 he worked at Estonian Academy of Music and Theatre's Drama School.

References

1937 births
2017 deaths
Estonian male stage actors
Estonian male film actors
Estonian male television actors
Estonian male voice actors
20th-century Estonian male actors
21st-century Estonian male actors
Recipients of the Order of the National Coat of Arms, 4th Class
Recipients of the Order of the White Star, 4th Class
Burials at Liiva Cemetery
Estonian Academy of Music and Theatre alumni
Academic staff of the Estonian Academy of Music and Theatre
Male actors from Tallinn